The following is an episode list for Batman: The Brave and the Bold, an American animated television series based in part on the DC Comics series The Brave and the Bold which features two or more superheroes coming together to solve a crime or foil a supervillain. As the title suggests, the cartoon focuses on Batman's "team-ups" with various heroes, similar to the original comic book series but different from the current one which features team-ups between various heroes. The series premiered on November 14, 2008, on Cartoon Network, and ended on November 18, 2011.

Series overview

Episodes

Season 1 (2008–09) 
Episodes are listed in order by production code, for the order by air date, see television order.

Season 2 (2009–11) 
Episodes are listed in order by production code, for the order by air date, see television order.

Season 3 (2011)
Episodes are listed in order by production code; for the order by air date, see television order.

Film (2018)

See also
 Batman: The Brave and the Bold
 List of Batman: The Brave and the Bold characters
 The Brave and the Bold

References

External links 
 Season 1 Episode Guide at The World's Finest
 Season 2 Episode Guide at The World's Finest
 Season 3 Episode Guide at The World's Finest
 Season 1 Episode Guide at IGN
 Season 2 Episode Guide at IGN
 Season 3 Episode Guide at IGN
 

Lists of DC Comics animated television series episodes
Lists of American children's animated television series episodes
Lists of Cartoon Network television series episodes
Episodes
Batman television series episodes
Batman: The Brave and the Bold episodes